
Gmina Topólka is a rural gmina (administrative district) in Radziejów County, Kuyavian-Pomeranian Voivodeship, in north-central Poland.

Villages
Gmina Topólka contains the villages and settlements of Bielki, Borek, Chalno, Chalno-Parcele, Czamanin, Czamanin-Kolonia, Czamaninek, Dębianki, Galonki, Głuszynek, Iłowo, Jurkowo, Kamieńczyk, Kamieniec, Karczówek, Kozjaty, Miłachówek, Opielanka, Orle, Paniewek, Paniewo, Rogalki, Rybiny, Sadłóg, Sadłóżek, Sierakowy, Świerczyn, Świerczynek, Świnki, Topólka, Torzewo, Wola Jurkowa, Wyrobki, Żabiniec, Zgniły Głuszynek and Znaniewo.

Neighbouring gminas
Gmina Topólka is bordered by the gminas of Babiak, Bytoń, Izbica Kujawska, Lubraniec, Osięciny, Piotrków Kujawski and Wierzbinek.

References
Polish official population figures 2006

Topolka
Radziejów County